Lloyd Augustin Biden Hildebrand (25 December 1870, in Tottenham, United Kingdom – 1 April 1924, in Levallois-Perret, France) was a British racing cyclist who competed in the late 19th century and early 20th century. He lived in France and married a French woman. He participated in cycling at the 1900 Summer Olympics in Paris, winning the silver medal in the men's 25 kilometre race.

References

External links
 

1870 births
1924 deaths
English male cyclists
English Olympic medallists
Olympic cyclists of Great Britain
Cyclists at the 1900 Summer Olympics
Olympic silver medallists for Great Britain
People from Tottenham
Olympic medalists in cycling
Medalists at the 1900 Summer Olympics
British emigrants to France